The Progress of Railroading is group of public artworks by American artist Louis Saint-Gaudens. This series of six sculptures were cut by Andrew E. Bernasconi, a high-grade Italian stone workman, between 1909 and 1911.  These statues are located at Union Station in Washington, D.C., United States. The sculptures represent deities related to rail transport in the United States.

Description

Six figures which stand at 18 feet high are on the main facade of the Union Station building. These granite sculptures are placed above three connected triumphal arches that make up the main entrance of the building. The six figures represent and mean:

Archimedes – Mechanics
Ceres – Agriculture
Apollo – Imagination or Inspiration
Themis – Freedom or Justice
Thales – Electricity
Prometheus – Fire

The east and west figures are meant to deal with the operational system behind railroads and the center figures represent creativity.

The west section is inscribed:

FIRE – GREATEST OF DISCOVERIES
ENABLING MAN TO LIVE IN VARIOUS CLIMATES
USE MANY FOODS – AND COMPEL THE
FORCES OF NATURE TO DO HIS WORK

ELECTRICITY – CARRIER OF LIGHT AND POWER
DEVOURER OF TIME AND SPACE – BEARER
OF HUMAN SPEECH OVER LAND AND SEA
GREATEST SERVANT OF MAN – ITSELF UNKNOWN

THOU HAST PUT ALL THINGS UNDER HIS FEET

The center is inscribed:

SWEETENER OF HUT AND OF HALL
BRINGER OF LIFE OUT OF NAUGHT
FREEDOM O FAIREST OF ALL
THE DAUGHTERS OF TIME AND THOUGHT

MAN'S IMAGINATION HAS CONCEIVED ALL
NUMBERS AND LETTERS ALL TOOLS VESSELS
AND SHELTERS – EVERY ART AND TRADE ALL
PHILOSOPHY AND POETRY – AND ALL POLITIES

THE TRUTH SHALL MAKE YOU FREE

The east side is inscribed:

THE FARM – BEST HOME OF THE FAMILY – MAIN
SOURCE OF NATIONAL WEALTH – FOUNDATION OF
CIVILIZED SOCIETY – THE NATURAL PROVIDENCE

THE OLD MECHANIC ARTS CONTROLLING NEW
FORCES BUILD NEW HIGHWAYS FOR GOODS
AND MEN OVERRIDE THE OCEAN AND MAKE
THE VERY ETHER CARRY HUMAN THOUGHT

THE DESERT SHALL REJOICE AND BLOSSOM
AS THE ROSE

Two eagles also flank the left and right side of the arches.

Creation process

When the Station was being constructed debate erupted regarding "who" the figures would be or represent. Historical American figures were considered, however, they did not fit into the Baroque architecture of the building, therefore allegorical figures were chosen. Many people were consulted regarding what figures to have St. Gaudens sculpt including Charles W. Eliot, the former president of Harvard University.

Condition

The Progress of Railroading sculptures were surveyed in 1994 by the Smithsonian's Save Outdoor Sculpture! program and was described as needing treatment.

See also
 List of public art in Washington, D.C., Ward 6

Further reading

Wasserman, James. The Secrets of Masonic Washington: A Guidebook to Signs, Symbols, and Ceremonies at the Origin of America's Capital. Destiny Books, 2008.

References

External links
Photo album from the official Union Station website
Union Station: Railroading, Progress of statues (1908) in Washington, D.C. from dcMemorials
Union Station's Statuary from LovingDC

Tourist attractions in Washington, D.C.
Monuments and memorials in Washington, D.C.
Rail transportation in the United States
1908 sculptures
Granite sculptures in Washington, D.C.
Outdoor sculptures in Washington, D.C.
Near Northeast (Washington, D.C.)